Valentina Georgiyevna Tsaryova (5 December 1926 – 12 May 2015) was a Soviet cross-country skier who competed in the 1950s. She earned a gold medal in the 3x5 km at the 1954 FIS Nordic World Ski Championships in Falun.

Cross-country skiing results

World Championships
 1 medal – (1 gold)

References

External links
World Championship results 

1926 births
2015 deaths
Soviet female cross-country skiers
FIS Nordic World Ski Championships medalists in cross-country skiing